The International Financial Reporting Standards Foundation or IFRS Foundation (sometimes IFRSF) is a nonprofit organization that oversees financial reporting standard-setting. Its main objectives include the development and promotion of the International Financial Reporting Standards (IFRS), through the International Accounting Standards Board (IASB) for accounting standards and the International Sustainability Standards Board for sustainability-related standards (the latter known as IFRS-S).

The IFRS Foundation states that its mission is to develop IFRS Standards that bring transparency, accountability and efficiency to financial markets around the world, and that their work serves the public interest by fostering trust, growth and long-term financial stability in the global economy.

The foundation is governed by a group of 22 trustees, themselves under the oversight of a "Monitoring Board" of public authorities.

Background

In 2001, the International Accounting Standards Committee (IASC, established 1973) reformed itself under a new dual structure consisting mainly of an independent standard-setting body, the International Accounting Standards Board, and a foundation that appoints and funds the IASB, initially named the IASC Foundation.

During the first twenty years of activity, the IASB was the foundation's dominant standard-setting body. In 2021, the IFRS Foundation established a second standard-setting board under itself, the International Sustainability Standards Board.

Activities

The IFRS Foundation hosts the IASB and a separate committee, the International Financial Reporting Interpretations Committee (IFRIC) which issues interpretations, which are documents that complement the IFRS standards and form part of the IFRS set. Separately, the IASB sets out IFRS for small and medium-sized entities (SMEs) to better meet the specific needs of SMEs than is possible with the full IFRS Standards, which are intended primarily for publicly listed entities. The IASB also develops and maintains the IFRS Taxonomy, consisting of elements that can be used to tag disclosures in financial statements prepared using IFRS Standards. Tagging makes information computer-readable and, therefore, more accessible to investors and other users of electronic company financial reports. The eXtensible Business Reporting Language (XBRL) is used to represent and deliver IFRS Taxonomy content.

Organisation and governance

The IFRS Foundation is funded in part by country-specific funding regimes involving stakeholder groups, or levies and other contributions through regulatory authorities, and also by self-generated income. As of 2022, its executive director is Lee White.

The foundation  is governed by a board of 22 trustees, including, as of 2022: 
 Erkki Liikanen (Chair), previously a governor of the International Monetary Fund and a member of the Governing Council of the European Central Bank;
 Teresa Ko (Vice-Chair), a Freshfields Bruckhaus Deringer's China Chairman and Senior Partner;
 Larry Leva (Vice-Chair), previously the global vice chairman Quality, Risk and Regulatory for KPMG International.
Sarah Al-Suhaimi, Chairperson of Tadawul.
The trustees' responsibilities include appointing members to and establishing the operating procedures of the IASB, Interpretations Committee and Advisory Council, and approving the foundation's budget. They are accountable to a monitoring board of public authorities, the IFRS Foundation Monitoring Board.

List of IFRS Foundation chairs
 Paul Volcker (2000-January 2006)
 Tommaso Padoa-Schioppa (January–May 2006)
 Philip A. Laskawy (May 2006-December 2007)
 Gerrit Zalm (December 2007-June 2010)
 Tommaso Padoa-Schioppa (June–December 2010)
 Robert R. Glauber and Tsuguoki Fujinuma (acting co-chairs, December 2010-December 2011)
 Michel Prada (December 2011-October 2018)
 Erkki Liikanen (October 2018 – present)

See also
 Financial Accounting Foundation in the United States

References

External links

International accounting organizations
International Financial Reporting Standards
International Accounting Standards Board
Non-profit organisations based in London
Standards organisations in the United Kingdom
Organizations with year of establishment missing